This is a list of towns and villages in County Cork, Ireland.

A
Adrigole
Aghabullogue
Aghada
Ahakista
Aherla
Ahiohill
Allihies
Ardfield
Ardgroom

B
Ballinacurra
Ballinadee
Ballinagree
Ballinascarty
Ballincollig
Ballindangan
Ballineen
Ballingeary
Ballinhassig
Ballinora
Ballinspittle
Ballintemple
Ballymacoda 
Ballyclogh 
Ballydehob
Ballydesmond
Ballygarvan
Ballylickey
Ballymakeera
Ballyvourney 
Ballymore
Baltimore
Bandon
Banteer
Bantry
Béal na Bláth
Belgooly
Belvelly
Bishopstown
Blarney
Boherbue
Buttevant
Bweeng

C
Canovee
Cape Clear
Carrigadrohid
Carrigaline
Carriganimmy
Carrigtwohill
Castlehaven
Castlelyons
Castlemartyr
Castletownbere
Castletownroche
Castletownshend
Castletown-Kinneigh
Charleville
Churchtown
Cloghroe
Clonakilty
Clondrohid
Clondulane
Cloughduv
Cloyne
Coachford
Cobh
Conna
Coolea
Cork City
Courtmacsherry
Crookhaven
Crookstown
Crossbarry
Crosshaven
Cullen

D
Derry
Doneraile
Donoughmore
Douglas
Drimoleague
Drinagh
Dripsey
Dromahane
Dunderrow
Duneen
Dungourney
Dunmanus
Dunmanway
Durrus

E
Enniskean
Eyeries

F
Farran
Fermoy
Fota Island
Fountainstown

G
Glandore
Glanmire
Glanworth
Glasheen
Glenbrook
Glengarriff
Glounthaune
Goleen
Gougane Barra

H
Halfway

I
Innishannon

K
Kanturk
Kealkill
Kilbrittain
Kilcrohane
Kilmichael
Kilnamartyra
Kilumney
Kilworth
Kinsale
Knockavilla
Knocknagree
Knockraha
Killeagh

L
Ladysbridge 
Laragh
Leap
Letter East
Letter West
Little Island
Liscarroll
Lisgoold
Lismire
Lombardstown
Lowertown
Lyre

M
Macroom
Maine South
Mallow
Mayfield
Meelin
Midleton
Milford
Millstreet
Minane Bridge
Mitchelstown
Monkstown
Montenotte
Mourneabbey
Mogeely

N
Nad
Newcestown
Newmarket
Newtownshandrum
Nohoval

O
Ovens

R
Rathcormac
Rhea
Riverstick
Rockchapel
Rosscarbery
Ringaskiddy

S
Sallybrook
Schull
Shanagarry
Shanbally
Shanballymore
Sheep's Head
Sherkin
Skibbereen

T
Timoleague
Togher
Toureen
Tower

U
Union Hall
Upton

W
Waterfall
Watergrasshill
Whiddy
Whitegate

Y
Youghal

 
Towns and villages
Articles on towns and villages in Ireland possibly missing Irish place names